Amanda Ava Koci (born Amanda Koçi; February 16, 1994), known professionally as Ava Max, is an Albanian-American singer and songwriter. She signed with Atlantic Records in 2016, through which she released her breakthrough single, "Sweet but Psycho", in August 2018. The song peaked at number one in 22 countries, and reached number two and number 10 on the Australian ARIA Charts and US Billboard Hot 100, respectively. In March 2020, Max released the song, "Kings & Queens", which peaked at number 13 on the Billboard Hot 100 and at number 19 on the UK Singles Chart. It was followed by the release of her debut studio album, Heaven & Hell, in September 2020, which charted at number two on the UK Albums Chart and at number 27 on the US Billboard 200. In November 2020, the song "My Head & My Heart" was released, which peaked at number 45 on the Billboard Hot 100 and at number 18 on the UK Singles Chart. Max released her second studio album, Diamonds & Dancefloors, on January 27, 2023.

Life and career

1994–2012: Early life 
Amanda Ava Koci was born Amanda Koçi, in Milwaukee, Wisconsin, on February 16, 1994. Max's parents are from Albania; her father, Paul, is from Qeparo and her mother, Andrea, is from Sarandë. Max has a brother named Denis, who is approximately seven years older than she. In 1991, her parents fled Albania after the fall of communism in the country, and lived at a Red Cross supported church in Paris for a year. While in Paris, they encountered a woman from Wisconsin and were given passports by her before immigrating to the United States to reside in the state, where Max was born. During her childhood, Max often saw her parents struggle to earn an income, as they each worked three jobs without speaking English. Her mother was a classically trained opera singer, while her father was a pianist.

Max moved with her family to Virginia when she was 8 years old, where she was raised in Hampton Roads. While living in Virginia, she competed in numerous Radio Disney singing competitions at Greenbrier Mall in Chesapeake and debuted at the NorVa in Norfolk when she was 10 years old as an opening act, where she performed Whitney Houston's 1987 song "I Wanna Dance with Somebody (Who Loves Me)". Max often traveled to Florida in order to perform in singing competitions, and began releasing music under the moniker Amanda Kay, including a 2008 extended play. At the age of 13, Max came up with the middle name Ava and adopted it as her first name after stating that she did not like being called Amanda while growing up.

Max adopted the stage name Ava at the age of 14, and moved to Los Angeles in pursuit of a music career at the suggestion of her mother, but was constantly rejected for being underage. Max relocated to South Carolina a year later, where she began writing songs about relationships she had observed, including those of her brother. She later stated that she was grateful for the move, as it allowed her to experience a normal childhood. During her time in South Carolina, Max attended Lexington High School for a year, after being previously homeschooled, and she recalled being constantly bullied there. After she turned 17, Max returned to Los Angeles with her brother, who acted as her manager. She acknowledged that the partnership "did not work out" due to differences and receiving orders from her brother and because neither knew anyone in the area. Max's difficulty in searching for producers and songwriters alone caused her to spiral "down a really bad path", which led her to drink at an early age and having to survive on 20 dollars a week.

2013–2017: Career beginnings and formations 

Max released "Take Away the Pain" in 2013, which was remixed by the Canadian duo Project 46 in July 2015. For several years, her demos were rejected and not returned by record producers and songwriters. She also faced several incidents of sexual harassment. In 2014, Max had her first meeting with Canadian record producer Cirkut at a dinner party in the Chateau Marmont. Cirkut was also an acquaintance of her brother. Max sang "Happy Birthday" to him, which led both musicians to work together, writing hundreds of songs and releasing "Anyone but You" on SoundCloud in July 2016. The song gained traction and attracted the attention of various record labels that contacted Max through email, ultimately leading her to sign a record deal with Atlantic Records in 2016. Max acknowledged that working with Cirkut changed her life, as she considered leaving the music industry after being creatively stifled.

After signing the deal at the age of 22, she began searching for a last name to use as her stage name, eventually deciding on Max. The name was chosen since it combined elements of being masculine and feminine. From 2016 to 2017, Max adopted her signature hairstyle titled the 'Max Cut', which is seen in her logo as a substitute for the 'A' in Max. On August 4, 2017, Max was featured on the Le Youth song "Clap Your Hands", where she sang two different melodies.

2018–2021: International breakthrough and Heaven & Hell

Max released the song "My Way" on April 20, 2018, which peaked at number 38 on the Romanian Airplay 100 chart. On May 11, 2018, "Slippin", a collaboration with Albanian-American musician Gashi, was released. On June 8, 2018, Max was featured on the song "Into Your Arms" by American rapper Witt Lowry. A month later, "Salt" was sent to SoundCloud. On August 13, 2018, she released "Not Your Barbie Girl" as a promotional single. "Sweet but Psycho" was released on August 17, 2018. The song became Max's commercial breakthrough, reaching number one in more than 22 countries including Germany, Switzerland, Austria, Norway, Sweden, New Zealand, and the United Kingdom, where it stayed at number one for four consecutive weeks. In January 2019, the song reached the top of the Billboard Dance Club Songs chart, and later peaked at number 10 on the Billboard Hot 100. Max was also featured on the Vice and Jason Derulo song "Make Up" on October 23, 2018, and made an appearance on David Guetta's 2018 studio album 7 on the track "Let It Be Me".

On March 7, 2019, she released the follow-up single "So Am I", which reached the top 10 in Poland, Norway, Finland and the Netherlands. A remix of the song was released on July 3, 2019, which featured South Korean boy band NCT 127. The songs "Blood, Sweat & Tears" and "Freaking Me Out" were released as promotional singles in July 2019. On August 7, 2019, Max was featured on the song "Slow Dance" by American singer-songwriter AJ Mitchell, and released "Torn" as a single on August 19, 2019. On September 4, 2019, she entered a joint co-publishing deal with Warner Chappell Music and Artist Publishing Group. On October 31, 2019, she released a music video for "Freaking Me Out" as a Halloween special. Max won Best Push Act at the 2019 MTV Europe Music Awards. On November 6, 2019, a duet called "Tabú" between Max and Pablo Alborán was released. Max performed at the Jingle Bell Ball on December 7, 2019. The previously released song "Salt" was sent to digital streaming platforms on December 12, 2019. She collaborated with British-Norwegian disc jockey and record producer Alan Walker on the song "Alone, Pt. II", which was released on December 27, 2019. "On Somebody" was released as a promotional single on December 30, 2019.

On March 12, 2020, Max released "Kings & Queens" as the fifth single from her then-unreleased debut studio album Heaven & Hell (2020). The song topped the Billboard Adult Top 40 on the chart dated December 12, 2020. She also appeared as a featured artist on the country song "On Me" with Thomas Rhett and Kane Brown. It was included on the soundtrack of the 2020 film Scoob! on May 15, 2020, accompanied with a music video. Max released "Who's Laughing Now" on July 30, 2020, and "OMG What's Happening" on September 3, 2020, as singles from the album. Heaven & Hell was released on September 18, 2020, alongside a music video for the song "Naked". The album peaked at number two on the UK Albums Chart and at number 27 on the Billboard 200. On November 13, 2020, Max was featured on "Stop Crying Your Heart Out" as part of the BBC Radio 2 Allstars Children in Need charity single, which peaked at number seven on the UK Singles Chart. "My Head & My Heart" was released on November 19, 2020, which served as a bonus track from the digital re-issue of Heaven & Hell. On June 8, 2021, Max released "EveryTime I Cry", which she stated was a "continuation" of her aforementioned studio album. She appeared on the R3hab and Jonas Blue song "Sad Boy" as a featured artist with Kylie Cantrall on September 10, 2021, in addition to Tiësto's song "The Motto" on November 4, 2021.

2022–present: Diamonds & Dancefloors 
In February 2022, Max hinted at a new project by replacing her 'Max Cut' hairstyle with cherry-red shoulder-length hair and emphasizing a red and pink appearance on her social media accounts. While interviewed at the Billboard Women in Music event in March 2022, she acknowledged that her second studio album was written the previous year during a personally difficult time. The album's lead single "Maybe You're the Problem" was released on April 28, 2022. Max announced her second studio album Diamonds & Dancefloors on June 1, 2022, which later released on January 27, 2023. She released "Million Dollar Baby" on September 1, 2022. The album's third single "Weapons" was released on November 10, 2022. On November 16, 2022, the Ubisoft dance game Just Dance 2023 Edition revealed that "Million Dollar Baby" would be featured in the game, with Max herself serving as the coach for the dance. She released the fourth single "Dancing's Done" on December 20, 2022. On January 12, 2023, Max released the fifth single "One of Us". She performed at the WorldPride festival in Sydney, Australia, on March 5, 2023. Max's first headlining concert tour, titled On Tour (Finally), is scheduled from April to May 2023, with shows across Europe.

Artistry and influences 
Max has been labeled as a pop and dance-pop singer, whose music often contains interpolations from previous songs. She has been compared to contemporary artists such as Sia, Lady Gaga, Bebe Rexha, Sigrid, and Dua Lipa. Max grew up listening to artists including Alicia Keys, Norah Jones, Celine Dion, Aretha Franklin, Fugees, Mariah Carey, and Whitney Houston. She also cited Beyoncé, Madonna, Gwen Stefani, Fergie, Britney Spears, Christina Aguilera, and Gaga as some of her influences. Max stated that Carey was the biggest influence on Heaven & Hell and recalled how she grew up listening to her music on loop, such as "Vision of Love" (1990).

Public image 

Max has often been compared to Lady Gaga for her music and "ostentatious presentation", which includes her platinum blonde hair, persona, and stage name. Chris DeVille of Stereogum criticized Max's music for being too similar to Gaga, stating that it "falls short in terms of lyrics, production, melody, dynamics, personality, and every other conceivable metric", despite recognizing that the latter was also highly compared to Madonna. Max responded to the comparisons, stating that while Gaga was an "incredible" artist, people should not compare her to other people only for having the same hair color and releasing pop music. Although she described the comparisons as "lazy", she understood that it is "an easy thing to do" after being fascinated with pop artists since her childhood.

Max acknowledged that she often goes against the grain while making public appearances, often seeking designers who are overlooked, and wearing outlandish outfits, as she wants "to give people an experience". She stated that she was influenced by fashion in the 1990s, citing Gwen Stefani and Cindy Crawford as influences. However, Max preferred making music in the studio than appearing in public, stating that she did not like the attention of the fashion and cameras on the red carpet. Her self-cut 'Max Cut' hairstyle consists of her asymmetric peroxide blonde hair parted down the center, with the right side containing a chin-length bob cut, while the left side was longer and wavy. She explained that she did not feel authentic with her normal haircut, and that it was about embracing herself and being unique. While interviewed by Audacy in 2020, Max described her hair as "symbolic of having the freedom to do your own thing" and a "visual representation of her self expression", stating that it was an escape from conformity.

Personal life 
Max has described herself as "100% Albanian" and stated that she wants to give back to the community. She is able to speak the language, but cannot read it. Max is outspoken about female empowerment, which is reflected in her music. In a 2023 interview with Nylon, Max revealed that she dated Cirkut briefly after they met, and have remained friends since then.

Discography 

Heaven & Hell (2020)
Diamonds & Dancefloors (2023)

Tours

Headlining
 On Tour (Finally) (2023)

Supporting
Maroon 52020 Tour (2021)

Accolades

Notes

References

External links 

 
1994 births
Living people
21st-century American singers
21st-century American women singers
American people of Albanian descent
American women pop singers
Atlantic Records artists
Musicians from Milwaukee
MTV Europe Music Award winners
Singers from Virginia